Marina Colasanti (born September 26, 1937 in Asmara, old Italian colony in Eritrea) is an Italian writer, translator and journalist. She lived in Libya during her infancy, and then she moved to Italy, where she lived for eleven years. Her family moved to Brazil in 1948 due to the difficult conditions in Europe after World War II.

In Brazil, she studied fine arts and worked as a journalist and a translator of Italian literature. She has published many books, including works of poetry, collections of short stories and children's literature. She is married to the writer Affonso Romano de Sant'Anna.

Prizes
Breve História de um Pequeno Amor, 2014, Prêmio Jabuti: Fiction Book of the Year
Passageira em trânsito, 2010, Prêmio Jabuti: Poetry
Uma idéia toda azul, 1978, O Melhor para o Jovem, from the Fundação Nacional do Livro Infantil e Juvenil.

Works 
Breve História de um Pequeno Amor (2014)
Hora de alimentar serpentes (2013)
Passageira em trânsito (2010)
Minha Ilha Maravilha (2007) – Ed. Ática
Acontece na cidade (2005) – Ed. Ática
Fino sangue (2005)
O homem que não parava de crescer (2005)
23 histórias de um viajante (2005)
Uma estrada junto ao rio (2005)
A morada do ser (1978, 2004)
Fragatas para terras distantes (2004)
A moça tecelã (2004)
Aventuras de pinóquio – histórias de uma marionete  (2002)
A casa das palavras (2002) – Ed. Ática
Penélope manda lembranças (2001) – Ed. Ática
A amizade abana o rabo (2001)
Esse amor de todos nós (2000)
Ana Z., aonde vai você? (1999) – Ed. Ática
Gargantas abertas (1998)
O leopardo é um animal delicado (1998)
Histórias de amor (série "Para gostar de ler" vol. 22) (1997) – Ed. Ática
Longe como o meu querer (1997) – Ed. Ática
Eu sei mas não devia (1995)
Um amor sem palavras (1995)
Rota de colisão (1993)
De mulheres, sobre tudo (1993)
Entre a espada e a rosa (1992)
Cada bicho seu capricho (1992)
Intimidade pública (1990)
A mão na massa (1990)
Será que tem asas? (1989)
Ofélia, a ovelha (1989)
O menino que achou uma estrela (1988)
Aqui entre nós (1988)
Um amigo para sempre (1988)
Contos de amor rasgado (1986)
O verde brilha no poço (1986)
E por falar em amor (1985)
Lobo e o carneiro no sonho da menina (1985)
A menina arco iris (1984)
Doze reis e a moça no labirinto do vento (1978)
Uma idéia toda azul (1978)

External links

Entrevista ao jornalista André Azevedo da Fonseca

1937 births
Living people
Italian translators
Italian women short story writers
Brazilian translators
Brazilian people of Italian descent
People from Asmara
Translators to Portuguese
Brazilian women short story writers
20th-century Brazilian women writers
20th-century translators
21st-century Brazilian women writers
21st-century translators
Brazilian women journalists
20th-century Brazilian short story writers
21st-century Brazilian short story writers
Italian women journalists
20th-century Italian women writers
21st-century Italian women writers
20th-century Italian short story writers
21st-century Italian short story writers